This article displays the rosters for the participating teams at the 2015 All-Africa Games (men's basketball tournament).

|}
| valign="top" |
 Head coach

 Assistant coach

Legend
 (C) Team captain
 Club field describes current club
|}

|}
| valign="top" |
 Head coach

 Assistant coach

Legend
 (C) Team captain
 Club field describes current club
|}

|}
| valign="top" |
Head coach

Assistant coach

Legend
Club – describes lastclub before the tournament
Age – describes ageon 20 August 2013
|}

|}
| valign="top" |
 Head coach

 Assistant coach

Legend
 (C) Team captain
 Club field describes current club
|}

|}
| valign="top" |
 Head coach

 Assistant coach

Legend
 (C) Team captain
 Club field describes current club
|}

|}
| valign="top" |
 Head coach

 Assistant coach

Legend
 (C) Team captain
 Club field describes current club
|}

|}
| valign="top" |
 Head coach

 Assistant coach

Legend
 (C) Team captain
 Club field describes current club
|}

|}
| valign="top" |
 Head coach

 Assistant coach

Legend
 (C) Team captain
 Club field describes current club
|}

|}
| valign="top" |
 Head coach

 Assistant coach

Legend
 (C) Team captain
 Club field describes current club
|}

See also
 AfroBasket 2015 squads

References

Basketball at the 2015 African Games
African Games basketball squads